Iran is notable for its degree of government-sponsored internet censorship. The Iranian government and Islamic Revolutionary Guard Sepah also block several social media and communications platforms, including YouTube, Facebook, Twitter, WhatsApp, Telegram, Snapchat,  Medium and Instagram. The government also blocks some streaming services, including Netflix and Hulu. Sites relating to health, science, sports, news, pornography and shopping are also routinely blocked.

Iranian internet is controlled by the General Staff of the Armed Forces of Iran and the Supreme Council of Cyberspace of Iran. The head of the General Staff of the Armed Forces of Iran is elected by the Supreme Leader of Iran, Ayatollah Khamenei, who advocates that the internet was invented by the enemies of Iran to use against its people. The sixth president of Iran, Mahmoud Ahmadinejad also supports internet censorship in the country. Despite their support of censorship, Khamenei and Ahmadinejad have shared posts on social networks that are blocked in Iran, such as Facebook and Twitter. Iranians use social media despite government restrictions, although many bloggers, online activists, and technical staff have faced prison sentences, torture, harassment and abuse.
In the last few months, two popular applications, WhatsApp and Instagram, were blocked in Iran due to protests against the government.

History

Early 2000s
Iran underwent a significant increase in internet usage in the early 2000s. Many users saw the internet as an easy way to circumvent Iran's strict press laws. As international internet usage grew, its censorship increased and many popular websites were blocked, especially after 2005 under the administration of conservative president Mahmoud Ahmadinejad.

In 2005–2018, Ayatollah Khamenei sent letters to the presidents of Iran, the General Staff of the Armed Forces of Iran, and the Revolutionary Guards (IRGC), ordering them to form a national intranet, called the National Information Network. The National Information Network was unveiled during the 2019 Iranian protests. The NIN works in a way similar to the Great Firewall of China, but with more strict monitoring. After YouTube was blocked in Iran, Aparat, an Iranian online video-sharing platform, was founded. In 2020, due to the activity of an Aparat user, the CEO of Aparat was sentenced to 10 years in prison because of an interview with children about sex and pornography by gelofen TV. The business of selling virtual private networks (VPNs), SOCKS, and proxy servers in Iran is worth millions (USD) due to their large demand. The twelfth Minister of Information and Communications Technology in Iran announced that the lucrative business of selling VPNs and proxies has generated substantial profits for its manufacturers and retailers, and there are efforts to stop these businesses.

In 2006 and 2010, the activist group Reporters Without Borders labeled Iran one of the 13 countries designated "Enemies of the Internet." Reporters Without the Borders sent a letter to the United Nations High Commissioner for Human Rights Navi Pillay to share its deep concern, and ask for her intervention in the case of two netizens and free speech defenders, Vahid Asghari and Hossein Derakhshan.

2010s
Following the 2009 election protests, Iran ratified the Computer Crimes Law (CCL) in 2010. The CCL established legal regulations for internet censorship. Notable provisions of the CCL include the following: Article 10, which effectively prohibits internet users and companies from using encryption or protecting data, in a manner that would "deny access of authorized individuals to data, computer and telecommunication systems"; Article 14, which criminalizes "producing, sending, publishing, distributing, saving or financially engaging in obscene content"; Article 21, which requires ISPs to maintain records of internet traffic data and the personal information of their Internet users; and Article 48, which requires Internet Service Providers to record data from telephone conversations over the internet.

In April 2011, Ali Agha-Mohammadi, a senior official, announced the government had plans to launch a halal internet that would conform to Islamic values and provide government-approved services. Such a network, similar to one used by North Korea, would prevent unwanted information from outside of Iran from entering the closed system. Myanmar and Cuba use similar systems.

In 2012, Iran's ministry of information and communication technology began testing a countrywide "national internet" network, as a substitute for services ran through the World Wide Web. It also began working on software robots to analyze emails and chats, to find more "effective ways of controlling user's online activities." One Iranian IT expert defended the program as aimed not "primarily" at curbing the global internet, but at securing Iran's military, banking, and sensitive data from outside cyber-attacks such as Stuxnet. In addition, by late January 2012, internet café owners were required to record the identities of their customers before providing services. According to the news website Tabnak, an Iranian policy statement states:Internet cafes are required to write down the forename, surname, name of the father, national identification number, postcode, and telephone number of each customer. Besides the personal information, they must maintain other information of the customer such as the date and the time of using the internet and the IP address, and the addresses of the websites visited. They should keep these informations for each individual for at least six months.In preparation for the March 2012 elections and the launch of a national internet, the Iranian government instituted strict rules for cybercafés. Ayatollah Ali Khamenei, Iran's Supreme Leader, instructed the Iranian authorities to set up the Supreme Council of Cyberspace, a body to oversee the internet. It consists of the president of Iran, Minister of Intelligence, and IRGC chiefs. It defines policy and coordinates decisions regarding the internet. It is thought to be the strongest attempt at internet censorship by any country to date. It requires all Iranians to register their websites with the Ministry of Art and Culture.

Also in March 2012, Iran began implementing a national Intranet. This effort was partially in response to Western actions such as the Stuxnet cyberattack on Iranian's main uranium enrichment facility, which fueled suspicions against foreign technologies. The government and Islamic Revolutionary Guard's response has been to mandate the use of Iranian email systems, block popular web-mail services, inhibit encryption use by disabling VPNs and HTTPS, and to ban externally developed security software.

In May 2012 Iran criticized Google for dropping the name "Persian Gulf" from its maps, leaving the feature unlabeled. Six days after Khamenei's statement, Iran announced that Google and Gmail would be added to the list of banned sites, to be replaced by the national network. Iranian media reported that the new system would be ready by March 2013. The network already hosted some government and academic sites.

The isolation of the separate network was also touted as an improvement to network security, in the wake of the Stuxnet. A computer virus was also found in Iran's major Kharg Island oil export terminal in April. Communications and Technology Minister Reza Taqipour said, "Control over the internet should not be in the hands of one or two countries.  Especially on major issues and during crises, one cannot trust this network at all."

In September 2012 Ayatollah Ali Khamenei called on Western leaders to censor the trailer for Innocence of Muslims, which was posted to YouTube.  Khamenei alluded to bans on Nazi-related or anti-gay sites in some countries, asking "How there is no room for freedom of expression in these cases, but insulting Islam and its sanctities is free?"

Starting in mid-2014, the government of then-President Hassan Rouhani sought to ease internet restrictions in the country, with Ali Jannati, the culture minister, likening the restrictions to the ban on fax machines, video recorders, and videotapes after the 1979 revolution.

In December 2016, Iranian Prosecutor Ahmad Ali Montazeri, who heads Iran's internet censorship Committee, banned and closed 14,000 websites and social networking accounts in Iran. He underlined that President Rouhani and the Interior Minister Rahmani Fazli agreed with him and have addressed "serious warnings" on this issue.

As of 2018, it is estimated that between 64% and 69% of Iranians are internet users.

Blocking in 2017–18 protests

During the 2017–18 Iranian protests, the Iranian government blocked internet access from mobile networks and various websites, including Instagram and Telegram, in an effort to stymie protests. At some points, the government completely blocked internet access in parts of the country. A January 2018 report by four special rapporteurs of the Office of the United Nations High Commissioner for Human Rights expressed concern about the blocking, stating, "Communication blackouts constitute a serious violation of fundamental rights".

2019 total Internet shutdown

Beginning on 17 November 2019, the Iranian government imposed a week-long total internet shutdown in a response to the 2019 fuel protests. The blackout was organized by the Supreme National Security Council and Ministry of Information and Communications Technology of Iran. Although access was eventually restored, it was the largest wide-scale internet shutdown in Iranian history.

2022 

Despite universal condemnation the government shutdown and slowed internet open-ended permanently since September. US government issued license D-2 sanctions relief for American internet companies to help Iranians.Earlier this the year cyberspace protection act was ran. Restrictions were put in place for LTE networks such as Irancell, Hamrahe-Aval And Rightel completely blocking access to all website excluding those hosted in Iran.

List of blocked websites
Iran's SmartFilter blocks access to most pornography, gay and lesbian sites, political sites, news media and software privacy tools. Iran has been accused of censoring more internet traffic than any other nation besides China. As of 2006, Iran's SmartFilter is configured to allow local Persian-language sites, and block prominent English-language sites, such as the BBC and Facebook. By 2008, Iran had blocked access to more than five million websites, whose content was deemed as immoral and anti-social.

Below is an incomplete list of well-known websites blocked by Iran:
 File hosting: 
 General: Internet Archive
 Videos: YouTube, Twitch, Vimeo, Nico Video, Newgrounds
 Images: Flickr, 9GAG
 Software: ApkPure
 Torrent indexing: The Pirate Bay
 Social media: LinkedIn, Facebook, Twitter, TikTok, VK, Disqus, Sina Weibo, OK.ru, Reddit
 News: Fox News, CBS News, Deutsche Welle, BBC, ABC News, NDTV, NBC News, CNN, Vice News
 Technology news: Uptodown, CNET, The Verge
 Messaging: Telegram, Facebook Messenger, Signal
 Blog hosting: Blogger (Blogspot), WordPress.com, Tumblr, Medium
 Music:  Pandora, YouTube Music
 Entertainment: Netflix, Zhanqi, Panda.tv, Disney+, Hulu
 Programming and Development: GitLab, Firebase, TensorFlow, Android

In September 2020, Abolhassan Firoozabadi, director of the National Cyberspace Center of Iran, described China as a successful "model" in censoring the internet. He added that censorship applies where "the operating system does not comply with Iranian law" or "create[s] cultural, social, political and security problems" for the government.

There is also state awareness that domestically produced content considered undesirable can pervade the internet, highlighted by the 2006 controversy over the appearance of a celebrity sex tape featuring a popular Iranian soap opera actress (or a convincing look-alike). (See the Iranian sex tape scandal)

Many Iranians remain on social media despite government restrictions.

During the Mahsa Amini protests internet blackout, approximately 80% of all popular websites were promptly blocked, including Instagram, WhatsApp, Apple’s App Store, Google’s Play Store, Skype, and LinkedIn. This came in addition to total internet blackouts across the country for hours per day.

Methods
The primary engine of Iran's censorship is the content-control software SmartFilter, developed by San Jose firm Secure Computing. The American company alleges that Iran did not purchase the software legally. Iran has since developed its own hardware and software to filter the internet. All internet traffic is routed through the state-controlled telecommunications infrastructure of the Telecommunication Company of Iran (TCI), which implements additional surveillance measures.

Dozens of internet service providers (ISPs) operate in Iran. All of them must implement content-control software for websites and e-mail, with strict penalties for failure to comply. As of 2008, at least twelve ISPs have been shut down for failing to install adequate filters. An ISP must be approved by both the TCI and the Ministry of Culture and Islamic Guidance before it can operate.  ISP must store all data sent or received by a user for at least three months, and must store data within Iran's borders.

Iran uses the lawful intercept capabilities of telecommunications systems to monitor communications by political dissidents and other individuals. A monitoring center installed by Nokia Siemens Networks (now Nokia Networks) intercepts and archives internet communications for Iranian law enforcement officials. Online social networks, especially Facebook, are also monitored. Citizens returning home from living abroad have been questioned and detained due to the contents of their personal Facebook web pages. After protests outside Iran following the 2009 elections, such social media monitoring increased.

Iran throttles the speed of the internet to frustrate users and limit communication. Mass-scale throttling has been observed following the 2009 Iranian presidential election, the weeks leading to the 2013 election, and during times of international political upheaval. In October 2006, the government ordered all ISPs to limit their download speeds to 128 kbit/s for residential clients and internet cafes; no reason was publicly announced. The purpose, as widely believed according to Reuters, was to constrain the consumption of Western mass media. As of 2010, ISPs in Tehran may offer a higher speed of at least two Mbit/s businesses, while the residential speed limit remaines. Since then, speed restrictions have been relaxed.

Deep packet inspection (DPI) is a technology that analyzes the contents of transmissions, even if they have been encrypted. Iran may use it to detect connections to TLS-based VPNs and use TCP reset attacks to interfere with them. In 2009, the Wall Street Journal reported that Nokia may have sold DPI software to Iran for monitoring and altering the content of internet voice and e-mail communications. Andrew Lighten, an employee of Nokia, claimed that it sold software to Iran for lawful interception, but that the company does not sell any products with deep packet inspection.

Punishment of dissidents

Lily Mazahery, a human rights and immigration lawyer who represents Iranian dissidents, reported that one of her clients was arrested after instant messaging with her. Ms. Mazahery said: "He told me he had received a call from the Ministry of Intelligence, and this guy when he went to the interrogation, they put in front of him printed copies of his chats with me. He said he was dumbfounded, and he was sent to prison."

Circumvention

Methods
In 2003, Voice of America began to operate a proxy server for Iranian citizens, free of charge, along with internet privacy company Anonymizer and the International Broadcasting Bureau. Whenever the proxy is blocked, it uses a new IP address until that one is also blocked. Some websites and keywords related to pornography are blocked in the American proxy, although the list of banned words is publicly available. Non-pornographic websites may be inadvertently blocked; for example, the banning of ass blocks access to the website of the United States Embassy.

United States sanctions

Following the 2009 Iranian presidential election, the US Senate ratified the Victims of Iranian Censorship Act (VOICE), which allocated  million to fund measures "to counter Iranian government efforts to jam radio, satellite, and internet-based transmissions."

In 2018, the Trump administration increased American economic sanctions against Iran. These sanctions were not intended to prevent Iranian civilians from accessing basic internet services, but multiple American technology companies subsequently blocked access to their services in Iran. Iranian users who work with the Iranian government or are involved in terrorism were also sanctioned; technology suppliers risk prosecution by the US government if selling web services to sanctioned users.

Identifying an internet user can be difficult, so some companies have entirely discontinued serving users in Iran. Apple's App Store and the messaging platform Slack have been unavailable in Iran since 2018. In 2019, access to free services on GitHub, GitLab, Amazon Cloud, and several video game services were also suspended. Such suspensions, however, may inadvertently strengthen censorship, although Amazon Cloud, another banned service, hosts most tools that help Iranians bypass the censorship filters. Internet developers have been forced to use less secure hosting tools, which leave websites vulnerable to cyberattacks and risk users' security.

These suspensions continue despite a General License D-1, first issued by the Office of Foreign Asset Controls (ORAC) in 2014, which authorizes private companies to provide certain "personal communications" technologies to users in Iran. When sanctions were re-imposed by the United States, the US Treasury Department highlighted that General License D-1 would help with "fostering internet freedom and supporting the Iranian people."

See also 
 
 Blogging in Iran
 Censorship in Iran
 Communications in Iran
 Internet in Iran
 
 Media of Iran
 National Information Network of Iran
Internet censorship in China

References

External links 

 Blocked In Iran—Test if any website is blocked in Iran in real-time
 Internet Enemies Report 2012, Reporters Without Borders
 Iran and Internet Filtering (OpenNet Initiative—16 June 2009 report)
 "Fed contractor, cell phone maker sold spy system to Iran"—Washington Times article (13 April 2009)
 "Tightening the Net: Internet Freedom in Iran."—a series of reports documenting Internet censorship in Iran by ARTICLE19
 How to Bypass Internet Censorship, also known by the titles: Bypassing Internet Censorship or Circumvention Tools, a FLOSS Manual, 10 March 2011, 240 pp.

 
Censorship in Islam
Iran
Iran
Internet in Iran